Animal Behaviour is a double-blind peer-reviewed scientific journal established in 1953 as The British Journal of Animal Behaviour, before obtaining its current title in 1958. It is published monthly by Elsevier for the Association for the Study of Animal Behaviour in collaboration with the Animal Behavior Society. It covers all aspects of ethology, including behavioural ecology, evolution of behaviour, sociobiology, ethology, behavioural physiology, population biology, and navigation and migration.

Abstracting and indexing 
The journal is abstracted and indexed in EMBiology, Scopus, and the Science Citation Index. According to the Journal Citation Reports, the journal has a 2020 impact factor of 2.844.

References

External links 
 
 Association for the Study of Animal Behaviour
 animal behaviour

Ethology journals
Elsevier academic journals
Monthly journals
Publications established in 1953
English-language journals
Academic journals associated with learned and professional societies